The Key Art Awards were an annual collection of honors given for outstanding achievement in artwork and other promotional materials advertising movies. The awards are sponsored by The Hollywood Reporter, a trade paper published for the entertainment production community.

The 36th Key Art Awards:

Winners
Best of Show - Audiovisual (tie):
Little Children
Thank You For Smoking
Best of Show - Print: 
Little Miss Sunshine
Best Posters:
Action/Adventure:
V for Vendetta
Animation:
Ice Age: The Meltdown
Comedy:
Little Miss Sunshine
Documentary:
An Inconvenient Truth
Drama:
Hard Candy
Horror:
The Descent
International:
Paris, je t'aime (Paris, I Love You)
Teaser:
Crank
Best Theatrical Trailers:
Action/Adventure:
Casino Royale
Comedy:
Thank You for Smoking
Documentary:
An Inconvenient Truth
Drama:
Little Children
Horror:
The Hills Have Eyes
Best TV Spots:
Action/Adventure:
X-Men: The Last Stand
Comedy:
Scary Movie 4
Documentary:
An Inconvenient Truth
Drama:
Little Children
Horror:
When a Stranger Calls
Best Theatrical Trailers & TV Spots:
Animation: 
Cars
International:
Casino Royale

Nominees
Best Posters:
Action/Adventure:
Crank
Superman Returns
Poseidon
Apocalypto
V for Vendetta
Animation:
A Scanner Darkly
Renaissance
Ice Age: The Meltdown
Monster House
Cars
Comedy:
Borat
Little Miss Sunshine
Nacho Libre
Running with Scissors
Thank You for Smoking
Documentary:
The U.S. vs. John Lennon
Deliver Us From Evil
An Inconvenient Truth
Sketches of Frank Gehry
Dave Chappelle's Block Party
Drama: 
Clean
Hard Candy
Little Children
El laberinto del fauno (Pan's Labyrinth)
Perfume
Horror:
The Descent
The Hills Have Eyes
Pulse
Saw III (Blood)
Saw III (Teeth)
International:
The Black Dahlia
Borat: Teaser #2
Borat: Teaser #1
The Prestige
Paris, je t'aime
Teaser:
Borat
Crank
Hostel
Madea's Family Reunion
V for Vendetta
Best Trailers & TV Spots:
Animation:
Cars
Barnyard
Monster House
Over the Hedge
Happy Feet
International:
Blood Diamond
Candy
Casino Royale
The Departed
The Host

References

External links
 The Hollywood Reporter - 36th Annual Hollywood Reporter Key Art Awards

2006 film awards